Rajshahi-2 is a constituency represented in the Jatiya Sangsad (National Parliament) of Bangladesh since 2008 by Fazle Hossain Badsha of the Workers Party of Bangladesh.

Boundaries 
The constituency encompasses Rajshahi City Corporation.

History 
The constituency was created for the first general elections in newly independent Bangladesh, held in 1973.

Ahead of the 2008 general election, the Election Commission redrew constituency boundaries to reflect population changes revealed by the 2001 Bangladesh census. The 2008 redistricting reduced the boundaries of the constituency. Previously it had also included Paba Upazila.

Members of Parliament

Elections

Elections in the 2010s 

General Election 2018

Fazle Hossain Badsha was re-elected unopposed in the 2014 general election after opposition parties withdrew their candidacies in a boycott of the election.

Elections in the 2000s

Elections in the 1990s

References

External links
 

Parliamentary constituencies in Bangladesh
Rajshahi District